Angelina Mikhaylova (born 9 June 1960) is a Bulgarian former basketball player who competed in the 1980 Summer Olympics.

References

1960 births
Living people
Bulgarian women's basketball players
Olympic basketball players of Bulgaria
Basketball players at the 1980 Summer Olympics
Olympic silver medalists for Bulgaria
Olympic medalists in basketball
Medalists at the 1980 Summer Olympics